ZOA or Zoa may refer to:

 Zoa Peak, a mountain in British Columbia
 Zoa tribe, an indigenous people living in the Amazon rainforest
 ZOA International, an international NGO based in the Netherlands; see 
 Zoa Morani, Indian actress
 Luc Zoa, Cameroonian footballer
 Oakland Air Route Traffic Control Center, abbreviated ZOA
 Zambia Orphans Aid, a not-for-profit organization based in Zambia, with fundraising arms in the UK and USA
 Zionist Organization of America, an American pro-Israel organization 
 Zone of Avoidance, regions of space that are obscured from view
 "zoa", a plural suffix often used in taxonomy
 Zoa, member of Weeekly
 ZOA, an energy drink founded by wrestler and actor "The Rock" Dwayne Johnson